Devon United Mine is a 1.0 hectare geological Site of Special Scientific Interest in Devon, England, notified in 1987.

Sources

 English Nature citation sheet for the site (accessed 22 July 2006)

External links
 English Nature website (SSSI information)

Sites of Special Scientific Interest in Devon
Sites of Special Scientific Interest notified in 1987
Geology of Devon
Mines in Devon